Alikram Bayramov (22 December 1968, Yukhary Dzhuraly, Bilasuvar, Azerbaijan SSR, USSR), is a popular Azerbaijani singer.

Biography
Alikram Bayramov was born December 22, 1968 in Yukhary Dzhuraly in Bilasuvar District.

When Bayramov was a child, his father died.

Because of his ambitions for music since childhood, he always crooned and it was consolation for him, he also made the people happy by crooning.

After he grew up, he did not waste his life and, Alikram started being familiar with music.

By creating his own group, he composed the music to acquit the sympathy of the people

Finally, with the composition of Asrin gozali he gained the sympathy of people and became the favorite of people.

He handles with his job at the moment.

Family
Bayramov is married. He has two children, and one grandchild.

Career
Since his adolescent age, he created his musical group and worked as a chief of The Culture Group of Bilasuvar town. In 1989, he started being invited to sing at weddings.

In 1997, during the concert, in Gachgin town of Bilasuvar, he was caught by our great leader H.Aliyev, then he went to the capital, and he started collaborating with a few poets and composers.

In 1997, he professionally started appearing in TV. Before the public, he participated in the creative concert of Zemfira Alishqizi for the first time.

Then he sang the compositions of a few favorite composers, and his compositions turned into people's favorite songs and he went on composing.

He is the author of Asrin Gozali, Gozlayacayam, Yaz chichayi, Yashayiram sanin uchun, Daniz arzularim, Ugur meleyim and other songs like these.

Repertoire 
 Darıxmışam
 Nəfəsim 
 Nə yaxşı varsan
 Sevgi cinayətdirmi ?
 Sənə nə deyim
 Həsrətim
 Ay ömrüm
 Bu dünyanı sevək
 Həyatıma xoş gəldin
 Fərəh qızım
 Son sevgi
 Yaraşıqlım
 Sevənlərə nəğmə deyək
 Uğur mələyim
 Küsmüşəm
 Mən sənin yanına qışda gəlirdim
 Neyləyim 2
 Sevgi mahnisi (Baladadaşın ilk məhəbbəti filmindən)
 Yalan deyil
 Zalım dostlar
 Biləsuvar
 Neyləmişəm
 Unudub getmə
 Alagöz yarım
 Azərbaycan
 Bu gözəl öldürdü məni
 Çıx get
 Evlən mənimlə
 Gəl apar məni
 Gözlə məni gələcəyəm
 Günahkarsan
 Kiçik qız
 Qərib oğlanlar
 Mübarəkdir
 Niyə gəlmir
 Şad olmuşam
 Yanan mən olum
 Son vida
 Bilmirəm
 Neyləyim
 Sultan yarım
 Alça
 Azərbaycan qızları
 Bu gül
 Dalğalar
 Evlən mənimlə
 Gəl bəri
 Gözlər danışır
 Xallıda olar (Aşıq mahnısı)
 Kimim var ki
 Qış günəşi (2017)
 Nazın öldürəcək
 Öldü var, döndü yox
 Təki, sən səslə məni
 Yaşamam sənsiz
 Çadralı qız
 Sarı qız
 Ay Ana o qızı al mənim üçün
 Bəxt ulduzum
 Bu sevgi
 Dünyanın gözəli
 Evlənmirəm
 Gəl, sənə sevmək öyrədim
 Gözləyəcəm
 Xəzəllərin rəqsi
 Küsmüşəm
 Mən sənin yanına qışda gəlirdim
 Neyləyim 2
 Sevgi mahnisi (Baladadaşın ilk məhəbbəti filmindən)
 Toy olsun
 Yaşayıram sənin üçün
 Ölərəm elə
 Əminə
 Sən də səndə
 Ay işığında
 Bəylə gəlin toyunda
 Canan
 Durna Qatar
 Əlvida
 Görüşə gəl
 Gözləyir
 İcazə ver
 Qapımı bağlı saxlama
 Mən tənha qaldım
 Nə boran, nə tufan (xalq mahnısı)
 Soruşuram Necəsən
 Vurulmuşam
 Yaz çiçəyim
 Ağlayaq bir yerdə ölək bir yerdə
 Qayıt
 Sübhədək
 Ölmərəm daha

References

1968 births
People from Bilasuvar District
20th-century Azerbaijani male singers
Living people
21st-century Azerbaijani male singers